The Peruvian sierra finch (Phrygilus punensis) is a species of bird in the family Thraupidae.

It is found in western Bolivia and Peru where its natural habitat is subtropical or tropical high-altitude shrubland.

References

Peruvian sierra finch
Birds of the Peruvian Andes
Peruvian sierra finch
Taxa named by Robert Ridgway
Taxonomy articles created by Polbot